Geert Evert Booij (born 1947) is a Dutch linguist and emeritus professor of linguistics at the University of Leiden. He is credited as the creator of construction morphology.

Career
Booij previously taught at the Vrije Universiteit and University of Amsterdam and has been a member of the National Research Council for Humanities since 1997. He was the Dean of the Faculty of Arts at the University of Leiden between 2005 and 2007.
He is a winner of Humboldt Research Award and an Honorary Member of the Linguistic Society of America.

Books
 The Phonology of Dutch (The Phonology of the World's Languages), Oxford University Press, 1995.
 The Morphology of Dutch, Oxford University Press. First edition 2002; second edition 2019.
 The Grammar of Words: An Introduction to Linguistic Morphology (Oxford Textbooks in Linguistics), Oxford University Press. First edition 2005; second edition 2007; third edition 2012.
 Construction Morphology (Oxford Linguistics), Oxford University Press, 2010.
 Yearbook of Morphology (ed.)

References

External links
 Personal Website

1947 births
Living people
Corpus linguists
Morphologists
Linguists of Dutch
Phonologists
Grammarians from the Netherlands
Academic staff of Leiden University
Academic staff of Vrije Universiteit Amsterdam
Academic staff of the University of Amsterdam
Syntacticians
Semanticists
University of Amsterdam alumni
People from Hoogeveen
Academic journal editors